OMOTENASHI (Outstanding MOon exploration TEchnologies demonstrated by NAno Semi-Hard Impactor) was a small spacecraft and semi-hard lander of the 6U CubeSat format intended to demonstrate low-cost technology to land and explore the lunar surface. The CubeSat was to take measurements of the radiation environment near the Moon as well as on the lunar surface. Omotenashi is a Japanese word for "welcome" or "Hospitality".

OMOTENASHI was one of ten CubeSats launched with the Artemis 1 mission into a heliocentric orbit in cislunar space on the maiden flight of the Space Launch System (SLS), that took place on 16 November 2022.

After deployment from the Artemis I second stage, JAXA reported unstable communications with the spacecraft. On 21 November 2022, a Twitter message sent by JAXA reported that further attempts to communicate with the lander, which was scheduled to begin its landing sequences that day, had been ended.

Overview 
The OMOTENASHI mission was to land the smallest lunar lander up to then on the lunar surface to demonstrate the feasibility of the hardware for distributed synergistic exploration system with multi-point exploration. Once on the lunar surface, the OMOTENASHI lander was planned to observe the radiation environment of the lunar surface. The OMOTENASHI orbiter and lander were designed by the Japan Aerospace Exploration Agency (JAXA). The principal investigator was Tatsuaki Hashimoto from JAXA. The spacecraft featured two body-fixed solar panels and lithium ion batteries. After measuring the radiation environment as it approached the Moon, OMOTENASHI's lander module was planned to perform a semi-hard landing on the lunar surface.

Flight
JAXA announced that OMOTENASHI had successfully separated from the ICPS interstage around 90 minutes after launch. However, as of November 17, 2022, the spacecraft had yet to achieve Sun acquisition, and communication was unstable. JAXA continued operations to "stabilise attitude, secure power and establish communication," but after failing to restore operations, they abandoned recovery attempts on November 22. Reports indicate that the loss was due to failure of the solar cells to point toward the Sun. They will not be facing towards the Sun until March 2023.The team is considering recovery operations if they are able to reestablish contact with the spacecraft.

Payload 
The lander's scientific payload consisted of a radiation monitor and an accelerometer.

Propulsion and landing 
OMOTENASHI was to use a cold gas thruster to enter a lunar-impact orbit, and a solid rocket motor for the landing phase. The entry and landing phases would have been informed by the use of an X-band two-way Doppler radar. The orbiting module was planned to enter at a shallow flight-path angle of ≤7°, and to be ejected when the solid rocket burn begins the deceleration manoeuvre. The rocket would have been ignited with a laser. After the deceleration rocket burn that was planned to last 15–20 seconds, OMOTENASHI's lander would have ejected the retrorocket, experiencing a free-fall of about 100 m. Just before impact, the lander was planned to deploy a single airbag about 50 cm in diameter to minimize the impact, estimated to be at 20–30 m/s.

See also 
The 10 CubeSats flying in the Artemis 1 mission
 Near-Earth Asteroid Scout by NASA was a solar sail spacecraft that was planned to encounter a near-Earth asteroid (mission failure)
 BioSentinel is an astrobiology mission
 LunIR by Lockheed Martin Space
 Lunar IceCube, by the Morehead State University
 CubeSat for Solar Particles (CuSP)
 Lunar Polar Hydrogen Mapper (LunaH-Map), designed by the Arizona State University
 EQUULEUS, submitted by JAXA and the University of Tokyo
 OMOTENASHI, submitted by JAXA, was a lunar lander (mission failure)
 ArgoMoon, designed by Argotec and coordinated by Italian Space Agency (ASI)
 Team Miles, by Fluid and Reason LLC, Tampa, Florida

The 3 CubeSat missions removed from Artemis 1
 Lunar Flashlight designed to map exposed water ice on the Moon
 Cislunar Explorers, Cornell University, Ithaca, New York
 Earth Escape Explorer (CU-E3), University of Colorado Boulder

References

External links 
 An OMOTENASHI page, in Japanese but it includes interesting images
 NSSDCA page

CubeSats
Missions to the Moon
Impactor spacecraft
Japanese space probes
Space probes launched in 2022
2022 in Japan
Secondary payloads
Satellites orbiting the Moon